Granger High School is a public high school located in Granger, Texas. It is part of the Granger Independent School District located in Williamson County.

Athletics
Granger High School participates in the following sports:

Baseball
Basketball
Football
Softball
Tennis
Volleyball

State Titles

Football - 
1997(1A)
Girls Track - 
2004(1A)

References

External links
Granger Independent School District

High schools in Williamson County, Texas
Public high schools in Texas
Public middle schools in Texas
Public elementary schools in Texas